"Dirty Mind" is the follow-up single in the U.S., and title track to Prince's third album, released in 1980.  The song is built around a keyboard riff created by Doctor Fink, which dominates the song.  The demo-like song lacks a chorus, and is a stark departure of the smooth R&B sound of Prince's first two albums.  The lyrics concern sexual thoughts, which are fairly representative of the other songs from the album.  The single's B-side is the ballad "When We're Dancing Close and Slow", from the previous year's Prince.  "Dirty Mind" reached number sixty-five on the soul chart.  Along with the tracks "Uptown" and "Head", "Dirty Mind" reached number five on the dance chart.

Track listing
"Dirty Mind" (7" Edit) – 3:23
"When We're Dancing Close and Slow" – 5:18

References

Prince (musician) songs
1980 singles
Songs written by Prince (musician)
Warner Records singles
Song recordings produced by Prince (musician)
1980 songs